Sorqan Shira or Sorgan Shira — was one of the Nine Ministers of Genghis Khan and ancestor of Chupanids. He belonged to Suldus clan of Taichiuds, originally being a farmworker under Taichiud chief Todoene-Girte.

Biography 
Sorqan Shira first appears in The Secret History of the Mongols, when Temujin manages to escape from the Taichiud captivity in 1177. Passing by Sorgan-Shira noticed a young man hiding in a river backwater, but reassured him, promising not to give out. Several times, Sorgan Shira persuaded the pursuers to continue the search for the fugitive elsewhere. As soon as they dispersed, Temujin headed for his savior's yurt, hoping for further help. Frightened by a possible revelation, Sorgan Shira was about to refuse Temujin, but his Chilaun and Chimbay stood up for the young Temujin. They removed and burned the block into which Temujin had been chained, and Sorgan himself hid him in a pile of sheep's wool, instructing his daughter Qa'daan to look after the fugitive.

He was found by Genghis Khan in 1201, after a battle with Taichiuds. Submitting to Genghis Khan, Sorgan Shira and his sons became generals for Genghis, his son Chilaun personally killed Taichiud chief Targutai-Kiriltukh. He was among 95 generals who were granted a mingghan during coronation of Genghis Khan in 1206.

Portrayals

Literature 

 The Blue Wolf by Kurt David (1966)
 Cruel Age by Isaak Kalashnikov (1978)
 Wolf of the Plains by Conn Iggulden (2007)

Cinematography 

 Genghis Khan (TVB TV series) (Hong Kong, 1987)
 Portrayed by Jiang Bula - Genghis Khan (2004 TV series)
 Portrayed by A Yu'er - Mongol (2007)

References 

Generals of the Mongol Empire